David Stafford (born 1949) is a English writer, broadcaster and occasional musician.

Stafford was born in Birmingham, England. He began his career in fringe and community theatre in the 1970s. In the early 1980s, he collaborated and toured with Alexei Sayle, which resulted in two series for Capital Radio, two plays for TV, a book, Great Bus Journeys of the World, and various songs and recordings including Doctor Marten's Boots. At the same time he was a presenter on the Channel 4 consumer programme 4 What It’s Worth, contributed to many arts programmes and documentaries including The Media Show (Channel 4) and extensively to The Late Show (BBC2).  His TV plays include Dread Poets Society (BBC2) co-written with the poet Benjamin Zephaniah. For ten years he also wrote a weekly column for the Saturday Guardian, eventually called Staffordshire Bull.

During the 1990s, Stafford presented Tracks for BBC2, Going Places for BBC Radio 4 and was a regular panellist on Radio 4's literary parody game, Booked. He took over from Pete McCarthy as host of the Radio 4 panel game X Marks the Spot, and frequently stood in for John Peel as the presenter of Home Truths. After Peel's death, he became first one of the pool of presenters and later sole presenter of the programme.

He has collaborated with his wife Caroline, writing comedies and dramas, mostly for radio, including Man of Soup, The Brothers, Hazelbeach, The True and Inspirational Life Of St Nicholas (winner of the Prix Marulic),The Day The Planes Came, The Year They Invented Sex, Hancock's Ashes and a series of legal dramas based on the true-life cases of Norman Birkett.

The couple have written five biographies, all published by Omnibus Press: Fings Ain't Wot They Used T'Be - The Life of Lionel Bart, (2011), which was chosen as BBC Radio 4's Book of The Week and shortlisted for the Sheridan Morley award; Cupid Stunts - The Life and Radio Times of Kenny Everett (2014); Big Time - The Life of Adam Faith (2015);  Maybe I'm Doing it Wrong - The Life and Music of Randy Newman (2016) and Halfway to Paradise - The Life of Billy Fury (2018).

In 2020, Stafford's first novel, Skelton's Guide To Domestic Poisons, was published by Allison and Busby.  The sequel, Skelton's Guide to Suitcase Murders followed in April 2021.

He lives in North London with his wife and writing partner Caroline.  They have three adult children.

References

External links
 Caroline and David Stafford's Website

1949 births
Living people
English radio personalities
People from Birmingham, West Midlands